The 2010 Boston Pizza Cup was held February 3–7 at the Olds Sportsplex in Olds, Alberta.  The winner, team Kevin Koe, represented Alberta at the 2010 Tim Hortons Brier in Halifax, Nova Scotia. Team Koe would eventually go on to win the Brier and capture the 2010 Capital One World Men's Curling Championship.

Although his team would have been entered automatically as the defending provincial champion, Kevin Martin did not compete because his team had won the 2009 Canadian Olympic Curling Trials and qualified for the 2010 Winter Olympics in Vancouver which started shortly after the Boston Pizza Cup. As a result, 2009 runner-up Randy Ferbey was entered as the defending champion.

Teams

Draw Brackets

A Event

B Event

C Event

Playoffs

External links
Official site
Past Champions

Boston Pizza Cup
Mountain View County
2010 in Alberta
Curling in Alberta
February 2010 sports events in Canada